Tifama is a monotypic moth genus in the family Notodontidae (the prominent moths) erected by Francis Walker in 1855. Its only species, Tifama chera, was first described by Dru Drury in 1773. The species is known from Suriname and Brazil.

Description
Upperside: antennae setaceous (bristly). Head, thorax, and abdomen greyish russet. Wings grey-ash coloured, the anterior having a dark brown irregular line running near the posterior and external edges to the anterior near the tips. Posterior wings immaculate. Underside: the same colours as the upper, without any marks. Margins of the wings entire. Wingspan nearly  inches (60 mm).

References

Notodontidae
Moths described in 1773
Descriptions from Illustrations of Exotic Entomology
Monotypic moth genera